Tar Angel is a Canadian drama film, released in 2001.

Directed by Denis Chouinard, the film stars Zinedine Soualem as Ahmet Kasmi, the patriarch of a family of Algerian refugees in Montreal whose values are tested when his oldest son Hafid (Rabah Aït Ouyahia) joins an anti-globalization activist group, sparking Ahmet's fears that the family may be denied Canadian citizenship. The film's cast also includes Hiam Abbass, Catherine Trudeau, Kenza Abiabdillah, Marc Beaupré, Raymond Cloutier, François Papineau and Maude Guérin.

The film premiered at the Montreal World Film Festival in 2001, where it won the award for Best Canadian film.

The film garnered three Genie Award nominations at the 22nd Genie Awards in 2002, for Best Actor (Soualem), Best Director (Chouinard) and Best Original Score (Bertrand Chénier). The film also garnered eight Jutra Award nominations, including Best Picture and Best Director.

References

External links 
 

2001 films
Canadian drama films
Films directed by Denis Chouinard
French-language Canadian films
2000s Canadian films